The 1904 Tennessee gubernatorial election was held on November 8, 1904. Democratic nominee James B. Frazier defeated Republican nominee Jessie M. Littleton with 55.72% of the vote.

General election

Candidates
Major party candidates
James B. Frazier, Democratic
Jessie M. Littleton, Republican 

Other candidates
John M. Ray, Socialist

Results

References

1904
Tennessee
Gubernatorial